The United States U-15 girls national soccer team represents the United States in tournaments and friendly matches at the under-15 level. They have appeared in three CONCACAF Girls' Under-15 Championships, in 2016, 2018 and 2022.

Competitive record
 Champions   Runners-up   Third place   Fourth place

CONCACAF Girls' Under-15 Championship

Results and schedule
The following is a list of match results from the previous 12 months, as well as any future matches that have been scheduled.

 Legend

Players

Current squad
23 players were called up for the West Palm Beach 2023 Camp.

Recent call-ups
The following players were called up in the past 12 months.

 2022 Portland Training Camp; October 2022
 2022 CONCACAF Girls' U-15 Championship
 2022 European Friendlies; June 2022

References

External links
 U-15 Girls' National Team

North American national under-15 association football teams
Youth soccer in the United States
Soc
U15
U15